Sauce (hispanicized spelling of Quechua sawsi willow) is one of fourteen districts of the province San Martín in Peru.

Geography 
Located in the foothills of the Cordillera Oriental (Peru), the town is 614 m a.s.l. and 51 km south of the Tarapoto city, across the Huallaga River, 6°42’12” south latitude and 76°15’15” west longitude.

Places of interest 
 Sawsiqucha

References